Michel-Marie Poulain (born 5 December 1906, Nogent-sur-Marne, died 9 February 1991, Mandelieu-la-Napoule) was a French transgender performer and painter whose style and technique were compared to those of Bernard Buffet and Marc Chagall.

Life 
Assigned male at birth, as a child Michel-Marie wore dresses at home and was sent to girls' school before attending a boys' high school (still with long hair). After cutting her hair short at 20, she served the national service with the dragoons. Afterwards, Poulain became a travesti cabaret performer under the name of Micky. There she met and married Solange, a fellow performer, and they had a daughter, Michele.

Poulain was also a painter, exhibiting at the Salon d'Hiver, the Salon d'Automne, the Salon des Indépendants, and the Salon des Tuileries in Paris.

In the early 1930s, Poulain twice consulted the sexologist Magnus Hirschfeld, first in Berlin, then, after the destruction of his Institut für Sexualwissenschaft in 1933, in Paris. Learning that Poulain wanted to be a woman and dressed as one, Hirschfeld offered to "make him into a woman," an offer Michel-Marie at the time declined.

Poulain served as a senior-sergeant in World War II. She was a prisoner of war in a stalag from which she escaped in 1941.

After undergoing several surgical interventions in 1946, she increasingly dressed as a woman and publicly functioned as one. She became a high-fashion model and continued to be a cabaret dancer and a painter. She stayed with her wife, and their daughter called Michel-Marie "Papa," even in public.

Poulain opened a gallery in Cannes to exhibit her paintings. She also practiced the art of stained glass and mural frescoes for churches, producing stained glass windows for the abbey La Colle-sur-Loup, decorating the Chapel of the White Penitents in Èze (1953), and restoring the chapel of Saint Sebastian, Sainte-Agnès, Alpes-Maritimes.

A biography by Claude Marais, J'ai choisi mon sexe (I chose my sex), was published in 1954.

Poulain is buried in Èze.

Jean Anouilh wrote that Poulain's art transcended prurient interest, as the artist transcended gender:Scandal, which always surrounds freedom, must not reflect on his work. Poulain is not an amusing figure of the Parisian fauna who also paints canvases, he is above all an artist, or better, a robust worker conscientious before the laws of his art. It was he who made the work of a creator, that is to say, a man in the best sense of the word. (Le scandale, qui entoure toujours la liberté, ne doit pas rejaillir sur son oeuvre. Poulain n’est pas une figure amusante de la faune parisienne qui brosse aussi des toiles, c’est avant tout un artiste, mieux: un ouvrier robuste et consciencieux devant les lois de son art. C’est lui qui a fait oeuvre de créateur, c’est-à-dire d’homme au meilleur sens du mot.)

Exhibitions

Individual

Collective 
 Salon d'Hiver, Salon d'Automne, Salon des Indépendants and Salon des Tuileries, Paris, late 1931.
 Philippe Marie Picard, Michel-Marie Poulain, Gerard Sekoto, Galerie Heyrène, Paris, 1952.

Collections

Private 
 The Luxembourg architect Paul Retter, a patron of Michel-Marie Poulain, owned many paintings which, after the collector's death, were sold at auction. Most of them, like that of Bettembourg and the dancing procession of Echternach, have remained in Luxembourger hands.
 Albert Sarraut.
 Charles Trenet, who said he found in Poulain's work "a reflection of his own poetic zaniness" ("un reflet de sa propre loufoquerie poétique").

Public 
 Musée de Cagnes-sur-Mer, Toulon, oil painting.
 Société muséale Albert-Figuiera, Èze, Portrait de Clorine Cottier-Abeille (1920-2007), drawing.
 Centre Pompidou, Paris, La partie de cartes, oil painting.

References

Bibliography (listed chronologically) 
 Gustave Fréjaville, Michel-Marie Poulain, Éditions de la Galerie Clausen, Paris, 1938.
 Pierre Imbourg, Michel-Marie Poulain, Éditions de la Galerie Paul Blauseur, Paris, 1946.
 Jean Anouilh, Pierre Imbourg and André Warnod, preface by Michel Mourre, Michel-Marie Poulain, Presses de Braun et Cie, 1953.
 Claude Marais, J'ai choisi mon sexe: Confidences du peintre Michel-Marie Poulain, Monaco, Les éditions de Fontvieille, 1954.
 Pieral, Vu d'en bas, collection Vécu, Robert Laffont, 1976, p. 239.
 Gérald Schurr, Le guidargus de la peinture, Les Éditions de l'Amateur, 1993.
 André Roussard, Dictionnaire des Peintres à Montmartre, Éditions André Roussard, 1999.
 Emmanuel Bénézit, Dictionnaire des peintres, sculpteurs, dessinateurs et graveurs, Gründ, 1999, tome 11, p. 184.
 Maxime Foerster, préface by Henri Caillavet, Elle ou lui? Une histoire des transsexuels en France, L'attrape-corps/La Musardine, 2012.
 Francesco Rapazzini, Indomptables: À l'avant-garde du XXe siècle, Éditions Edite, 2013.
 Francesco Rapazzini, Le Moulin Rouge en folies: Quand le cabaret le plus célèbre du monde inspire les artistes, Le Cherche Midi, 2016.

External links 
 Page of Galerie Roussard with paintings of Michel-Marie Poulain.
 Getty Images photographies of Michel Marie Poulain.
 Michel-Marie Poulain on Artnet.
 J'ai choisi mon sexe book cover.
 Michel-Marie Poulain (1953) book cover.
 Michel-Maire Poulain: Past auction lots at Gazette Drouot

20th-century French painters
1906 births
1991 deaths
Transgender artists
Transgender women
20th-century LGBT people